The women's 1000 meter at the 2019 KNSB Dutch Single Distance Championships took place in Heerenveen at the Thialf ice skating rink on Sunday 30 December 2018. There were 24 participants.

Result 

Source:

References 

Single Distance Championships
2019 Single Distance
World